Brookesia ramanantsoai is a species of chameleon. It is found in Madagascar.

References

Brookesia
Reptiles of Madagascar
Reptiles described in 1975
Taxa named by Édouard-Raoul Brygoo
Taxa named by Charles Domergue